Edmond Gaujac (10 February 1895 – 5 October 1962) was a French composer and music educator.

Life
Edmond Gaujac was born in Toulouse. After finishing school Gaujac completed an apprenticeship with a violin maker. He also attended courses at the music academy of his hometown. In 1911, he entered the Conservatoire de Paris, where he studied harmony with Xavier Leroux. His education was interrupted by the First World War. He was drafted into the army and awarded a Croix de Guerre.

After the War he continued his education at the music academy with Vincent d'Indy. In addition, he started a job as hornist in the orchestra of the Concerts Colonne, which was led at that time by Gabriel Pierné. After a Second Grand Prix in 1924 he won the Premier Grand Prix in 1927 at the competition for the Prix de Rome with the lyrical scene Coriolan.

After his return from his stay at the Villa Medici in Rome in 1931, Gaujac became director of the conservatoire de Lille. At the same time he took over the direction of the orchestra of Radio Lille. In 1945 he returned to Toulouse where he took over the direction of the music academy as successor of Aymé Kunc. The composers Jean-Marie Depelsenaire and Marcelle Villin were among his pupils .

Gaujac composed orchestral works, an oratorio, chamber music and songs.

Selected works
 Les Amants de Vérone, cantata, 1924
 Coriolan, lyrical scene, 1927
 Vocalise for violin, viola, flute and oboe or trumpet, 1936
 Scherzetto for piano, 1937
 Pastorale for piano, 1938
 Impulsions für Klavier zu vier Händen, 1939
 Esquisses provençales for orchestra
 Symphonie romantique
 Fantaisie for orchestra
 Vénus et Adonis, lyrical scene
 Sainte-Germaine de Pibrac, Oratorio, 1935 by the Concerts Colonne
 Funambulie for saxophone
 3 Pièces pantomimiques for alto saxophone and piano
 Rêves d’enfant, small suite for four saxophones.

References

External links
 Biography on Musica et Memoria

1895 births
1962 deaths
20th-century French composers
20th-century French male musicians
Conservatoire de Paris alumni
French classical composers
French male classical composers
French music educators
Musicians from Toulouse
Prix de Rome for composition